Hangzhou No. 2 High School is a coeducational public secondary school in Hangzhou, Zhejiang, China. It has more than 2,800 students, aged 16 to 18 years. It was founded in 1899 by American Christian missionary W. S. Sweet. The school has gained prestigious reputation in many aspects, often referred to as one of the "three top high schools" in Hangzhou. The school serves as one of three permanent venues of Harvard Summit for Young Leaders in China.

The CEEB Code of the school is 694339.

Awards and recognition 
The school was listed as one of the Key Middle Schools of Zhejiang Province in 1978 and was appointed as a First-Class Key Middle School in 1995 by the Zhejiang Education Committee. The school was the first-ever school that was officially recognized as a First-tier Model School of Zhejiang Province.

Notable alumni 
Yu Dafu (1896–1945) class of 1911, writer and poet
Dong Xiwen (1914-1973) class of 1932, painter
Feng Zhongyun (冯仲云) (1908-1968) class of 1923, Senior official of China; Order of Bayi recipient. Former President, Harbin Institute of Technology.
Guan Zihuai (管子怀) (1934-) class of 1951, former Chinese ambassador to Oman, Kuwait, and Bahrain.

Sister schools 
Providence Day School, Charlotte, North Carolina, United States
Morley Senior High School, Norand, Western Australia, Australia
Einhard Gymnasium Aachen

References

External links 
 

Education in Hangzhou
High schools in Zhejiang